Emery is a populated place situated in Graham County, Arizona, United States.

The community was named after Emery, Utah.

References

Populated places in Graham County, Arizona